Crossing Souls is an action-adventure video game developed by Spain-based indie development studio Fourattic and published by Devolver Digital. The game was released on 13 February 2018 for Microsoft Windows, macOS, Linux PlayStation 4 and 26 July 2018 on Nintendo Switch.

Plot 
Crossing Souls plays in 1945, where archeologist Dr. Carter Jones is sent by the U.S. government onto a secret mission to recover the Duat Stone, an artifact of mysterious, supernormal power, leading him to a forgotten tomb in the Valley of the Kings near Cairo, Egypt. Dr. Jones is able to get a hold of the stone, but disappears and is never found. Half a century later, in 1986, five teenage friends, Chris, Matt, Charlie, Big Joe and Kevin, discover his corpse on a bicycle trip through the woods outside their quiet town in California, and with it also the Duat Stone. Taking the stone home and driven by curiosity, Matt is able to build a device with which the friends are able to unlock and control the stone's power. Though the friends do not fully understand the artifact's power, they find out that it is able to make them see and interact with the spirits of the dead. However, their curiosity gets into the scope of former U.S. Army general Colonel Beringer, self-proclaimed Major Oh Russ, who had organized the Duat Stone's recovery in 1945, and now wants to stop the friends to get deeper into the artifact's power. While the five teenagers go on an epic journey to uncover the secret behind the artifact and the spirits, that are made visible for them, Oh Russ threatens them and captures their parents and friends, to regain the Duat Stone himself and receive the power to control the deceased to accomplish his world invasion plan. At the end of the game, after Oh Russ' death, the two surviving members of the team, Chris and Charlie, activate the interdimensional portal to defeat Seth, who was Oh Russ' master and the Egyptian god of destruction that usurped his brother Osis' position as the Keeper of the Living Balance. Chris and Charlie destroy Seth with their own souls, thus saving their families and loved ones at the cost of their own lives.

Gameplay 

Crossing Souls is built-up around a large, open world, in which the player is set to explore and eventually discover new areas and find clues for their current task from an orthogonal point of view. These tasks are bound to puzzles, which are solved in different ways. One of these ways is dying, meaning that the player switches into the world of the dead using the Duat Stone. The world of the dead gives the player new passages and the ability to interact with the spirits of the dead. Both, dead and alive, will deliver tips and tasks to aid the player in their mission. Another way puzzles are solved is fighting, in which the player gets involved in a combat situation, having to defeat one or multiple enemies to proceed through a guarded passage or acquire a relevant item. Lastly, the player will encounter logic puzzles, which can go from simply pushing an object to figuring out complex switch mechanisms and breaking codes. Each of the five characters has different abilities and weapons, giving the player the task to switch between them and use their specifications to be able to continue or to complete a certain action. At the end of an level, a boss or major personality of the dead will appear, either fighting or guiding the player. In-between levels, the player watches cutscenes designed specifically to look like a TV show from the 1980s, the time in which the game is set.

Development 
Crossing Souls storyline was largely influenced by those of the films The Goonies, E.T. the Extra-Terrestrial and Super 8, while the level design and the orthogonal view were adapted from the original The Legend of Zelda, with the animation style of the cutscenes having been inspired by Teen Wolf, Saint Seiya, He-Man and the Masters of the Universe and Teenage Mutant Ninja Turtles, all of which are items of the 1980s. Development on the game started in January 2014, after the final update for Fourattic's previous game, Bin This Pic: Guess the Wrong One (or Odd Pic Out), was released. The pre-production was first presented to the public through the TIGSource forums on 5 February 2014. In the forums, it was met with a positive reception, thus, development was continued and team members regularly posted development updates. Around March 2014, the team was running out of money, wherefore the development on the game was halted, enabling the team to create Pixel Puzzle Mania, a free-to-play puzzle video game for iOS, published by Genera Games, which was released on 29 August 2014. In August 2014, Fourattic partnered with Devolver Digital for a publishing deal on Crossing Souls. Devolver Digital announced that they would publish it, regardless if, and how far, the project would get funded. Crossing Souls was successfully funded on 13 December 2014, and the campaign ended on 17 December 2014 with a total of  raised. In January 2015, using the funds raised from Kickstarter, Fourattic moved from their original attic location to a new office in Sevilla, Spain and rebooted development on the game. A first demo of Crossing Souls was shown off at E3 2015, from 16–18 June 2015, and at Gamelab Barcelona 2015, from 24–26 June 2015. As announced in December 2017, the game will be released on 13 February 2018. Devolver Digital announced the game was releasing on Nintendo Switch on 26 July 2018 as part of Devolver Digital's 'Summer of Devolver'.

Reception 

Crossing Souls received "generally favourable reviews" for the PlayStation 4 version, while the Windows and Nintendo Switch versions were met with "mixed or average" reviews, according to review aggregator Metacritic.

References

External links 
 

2018 video games
Action-adventure games
Devolver Digital games
Linux games
MacOS games
Nintendo Switch games
PlayStation 4 games
PlayStation Network games
Video games developed in Spain
Windows games
Video games set in 1986